The Eyre Basin beaked gecko (Rhynchoedura eyrensis) is a gecko endemic to Australia.  It is found in New South Wales, South Australia and Queensland.

References

Rhynchoedura
Reptiles described in 2011
Taxa named by Mitzy Pepper
Taxa named by Paul Doughty
Taxa named by Mark Norman Hutchinson
Taxa named by J. Scott Keogh
Geckos of Australia
Reptiles of South Australia
Reptiles of Queensland
Reptiles of New South Wales
IUCN Red List least concern species